The 2019 Oita Trinita season involves the team competing in the J1 League after being promoted by finishing 2nd in the 2018 J2 League. They will also compete in the J.League Cup and the Emperor's Cup.

Squad 
As of 2 March 2019.

Competitions

J1 League

League table

Results

J. League Cup

Group stage

Emperor's Cup

References 

Oita Trinita
Oita Trinita seasons